Sheriff Mountain is a summit in Beaverhead County, Montana, in the United States.

References

Mountains of Beaverhead County, Montana
Mountains of Montana